Proto-Indo-Iranian paganism (or Proto-Aryan paganism) was the beliefs of the speakers of Proto-Indo-Iranian (the Indo-Iranians) and includes topics such as the mythology, legendry, folk tales, and folk beliefs of early Indo-Iranian culture. By way of the comparative method, Indo-Iranian philologists, a variety of historical linguist, have proposed reconstructions of entities, locations, and concepts with various levels of security in early Indo-Iranian folklore and mythology (reconstructions are indicated by the presence of an asterisk). The present article includes both reconstructed forms and proposed motifs from the early Indo-Iranian period, generally associated with the Sintashta culture (2050–1900 BCE).

Divine beings

Location

Entities

Other

See also
Proto-Celtic paganism
Proto-Germanic paganism
Substratum in Vedic Sanskrit

References

Bibliography

Indo-Iranian peoples